Cal Basketball may refer to:
 California Golden Bears men's basketball, the men's basketball team of the University of California, Berkeley.
 California Golden Bears women's basketball, the women's basketball team the University of California, Berkeley.